Joakim Latonen (born 24 February 1998) is a Finnish professional footballer who plays for Mariehamn, as a midfielder.

Club career
For the 2022 season, he signed a one-year contract with Mariehamn.

References

1998 births
Living people
Finnish footballers
Association football midfielders
Turun Palloseura footballers
Salon Palloilijat players
IFK Mariehamn players
Veikkausliiga players
Kakkonen players
Ykkönen players